Vasileiada (before 1928: Ζαγοριτσάνη - Zagoritsani Macedonian and ) is a village in Kastoria Regional Unit, Macedonia, Greece.

After Zagoritsani became part of Greece, the village mosque was demolished. The Greek census (1920) recorded 1105 inhabitants in the village. Following the Greek-Turkish population exchange, in 1926 in Zagoritsani there were 32 refugee families from Pontus. The Greek census (1928) recorded 735 village inhabitants. There were 33 refugee families (112 people) in 1928.

Notable people
Dimitar Blagoev (1856–1924), Bulgarian political leader and philosopher
Anastas Yankov (1857–1906), Bulgarian Army officer
Maslina Grancharova (1874–1958) teacher and revolutionary

References

Populated places in Kastoria (regional unit)